The First United Indonesia Cabinet, formerly the United Indonesia Cabinet was the official name of the presidential cabinet of Indonesia, led by President Susilo Bambang Yudhoyono during his first period in office 2004–2009. It consisted of Ministers, secretaries and an Attorney General. They were sworn on 21 October 2004 for a term of office until 2009. The cabinet was reshuffled twice, on 7 December 2005 and 9 May 2007.

Cabinet lineup 
Lineup of United Indonesia Cabinet when it was created (21 October 2004), the first reshuffle (7 December 2005), and the second reshuffle (9 May 2007):

{| class="wikitable" border="1"
|- bgcolor=LightGrey
!  rowspan=2 | Position || colspan=3 | Effective
|- bgcolor=LightGrey
! 21 October 2004 || Reshuffle I:  7 December 2005 || Reshuffle II:  9 May 2007
|- bgcolor=MintCream 
| colspan=4 |

Coordinating ministers 
|-
| Coordinating Minister for Legal, Political and Security Affairs
| colspan=3|Widodo A. S.
|-
| Coordinating Minister for the Economy
| Aburizal Bakrie
| bgcolor=LightYellow | Boediono
| |Boediono  Sri Mulyani Indrawati (acting)
|-
| Coordinating Minister for People's Welfare
| Alwi Shihab
| bgcolor=LightYellow colspan=2| Aburizal Bakrie
|-
| State Secretary Minister
| colspan=2|Yusril Ihza Mahendra
| bgcolor=LightGreen | Hatta Rajasa
|- bgcolor=MintCream 
| colspan=4 |

Departmental ministers 
|-
| Minister of Foreign Affairs
| colspan=3|Hassan Wirajuda
|- 
| Minister of Home Affairs 
| colspan=2|M. Ma'ruf
| bgcolor=LightGreen | Mardiyanto  (29-08-2007)
|-
| Minister of Defense
| colspan=3|Juwono Sudarsono
|- 
| Minister of Law and Human Rights 
| colspan=2|Hamid Awaluddin
| bgcolor=LightGreen | Andi Mattalata
|- 
| Minister of Trade
| colspan=3|Mari Elka Pangestu
|-  
| Minister of Industry 
| Andung Nitimihardja
| bgcolor=LightYellow colspan=2 | Fahmi Idris
|- 
| Minister of Energy and Natural Resources
| colspan=3|Purnomo Yusgiantoro
|-  
| Minister of Finance
| Jusuf Anwar
| bgcolor=LightYellow colspan=2| Sri Mulyani Indrawati
|- 
| Minister of Forestry
| colspan=3|M. S. Kaban
|-  
| Minister of Agriculture
| colspan=3|Anton Apriantono
|-  
| Minister of Health 
|colspan=3| Siti Fadilah Supari
|-  
| Minister of Public Works
| colspan=3|Djoko Kirmanto
|-  
| Minister of Social Services
| colspan=3|Bachtiar Chamsyah
|- 
| Minister of National Education

| colspan=3|Bambang Sudibyo
|-  
| Minister of Religious Affairs
| colspan=3|M. Maftuh Basyuni
|-  
| Minister of Maritime Affairs and Fisheries 
| colspan=3|Freddy Numberi
|- 
| Minister of Transportation
| colspan=2|Hatta Rajasa
| bgcolor=LightGreen | Jusman Syafii Djamal
|-  
| Minister of Labor and Transmigration 
| Fahmi Idris
| bgcolor=LightYellow colspan=2| Erman Suparno
|-
| Minister of Culture and Tourism 
| colspan=3|Jero Wacik
|- 
| Minister of Communication and Information 
| colspan=2|Sofyan Djalil
| bgcolor=LightGreen | Mohammad Nuh
|- bgcolor=MintCream 
| colspan=4 |

State ministers 
|- 
| State Minister for Cooperatives and Small and Medium Enterprises 
| colspan=3|Suryadharma Ali
|-  
| State Minister of Environment (Indonesia)|State Minister of Environment
| colspan=3|Rachmat Witoelar
|- 
| State Minister for Research and Technology
|colspan=3| Kusmayanto Kadiman
|-  
| State Minister for State Apparatus Utilization
| colspan=3|Taufik Effendy
|-  
| State Minister for Women's Empowerment
| colspan=3|Meuthia Hatta Swasono
|-  
| State Minister for Acceleration of Development in Underdeveloped Regions 
| colspan=2|Saifullah Yusuf
| bgcolor=LightGreen | Mohammad Lukman Edy
|-  
| State Minister for Youth and Sports Affairs
| colspan=3|Adhyaksa Dault
|- 
| State Minister for State Enterprises
| colspan=2|Sugiharto
| bgcolor=LightGreen | Sofyan Djalil
|- 
| State Minister for National Development Planning and Chairperson of the National Development Planning Agency (Bappenas) 
| Sri Mulyani
| bgcolor=LightYellow colspan=2| Paskah Suzetta
|- 
| State Minister for Public Housing 
| colspan=3|Muhammad Yusuf Asy'ari
|- bgcolor=MintCream 
| colspan=4 |

Non-Ministerial posts 
|-
| Attorney General
| colspan=2|Abdul Rahman Saleh
| bgcolor=LightGreen | Hendarman Supandji
|-
| Cabinet Secretary
| colspan=3|Sudi Silalahi
|-
| Commander of the Indonesian Armed Forces
| Air Chief Marshal Djoko Suyanto
| Air Chief Marshal Djoko Suyanto
| General Djoko Santoso
|-
| Chief of the Indonesian National Police
| General Sutanto
| General Sutanto
| General Bambang Hendarso Danuri
|-
| Governor of the Bank of Indonesia
| Burhanuddin Abdullah
| Burhanuddin Abdullah
| BoedionoDarmin Nasution (acting)
|}

Reshuffles
The first reshuffle, announced on 7 December 2007 resulted in the following changes:

{| class="wikitable" border="1"
|- valign=top
| width=30% |
 Three new ministers:
 Boediono (Coordinating Minister for the Economy)
 Paskah Suzetta (State Minister for National Development Planning and Chairperson of the National Development Planning Agency)
 Erman Soeparno (Minister of Labor and Transmigration)
| width=30% |
 Three ministers that were rotated to a different office:
 Aburizal Bakrie (Coordinating Minister for People's Welfare, previously Coordinating Minister for the Economy)
 Sri Mulyani Indrawati (Minister of Finance, previously State Minister for National Development Planning and Chairperson of the National Development Planning Agency)
 Fahmi Idris (Minister of Industry, previously Minister of Labor and Transmigration)
| width=30% |
 Three ministers that were relieved from the cabinet:
 Jusuf Anwar (Minister of Finance)
 Andung Nitimihardja (Minister of Industry)
 Alwi Shihab (Coordinating Minister for People's Welfare)
|}

The second reshuffle, announced on 7 May 2007, changed some of ministers of the cabinet. The changes are:

{| class="wikitable" border="1"
|- valign=top
| width=30% |
 Five new ministers:
 Andi Mattalata (Minister of Law and Human Rights)
 Mohammad Lukman Edy (State Minister for Acceleration of Development in Backwards Regions)
 Jusman Syafii Djamal (Minister of Transportation)
 Mohammad Nuh (Minister of Information and Communication)
 Hendarman Supandji (Attorney General)
| width=30% |
 Two ministers that were rotated to a different office:
 Hatta Rajasa (State Secretary, previously Minister of Transportation)
 Sofyan Djalil (State Minister of State Enterprises, previously Minister of Information and Communication)
| width=30% |
 Five ministers that were relieved from the cabinet:
 Hamid Awaluddin (Minister of Law and Human Rights)
 Soegiharto (State Minister of State Enterprises)
 Yusril Ihza Mahendra (State Secretary)
 Saifullah Yusuf (State Minister for Acceleration of Development in Backwards Regions)
 Abdul Rahman Saleh (Attorney General)
|}

Later changes
Boediono was replaced by Sri Mulyani Indrawati as Coordinating Minister for Economics due to Boediono's appointment for the Governor of the Bank of Indonesia in May 2008.
Maj. Gen. (ret.) Mardiyanto replaced Lt. Gen. (ret.) M. Ma'ruf as Minister of Interior Affairs in August 2007 after Ma'ruf suffered a stroke and heart attack in March.

See also

Politics of Indonesia

References

External links
 United Indonesia Cabinet, May 7, 2007
 United Indonesia Cabinet, December 5, 2005
 United Indonesia Cabinet, October 21, 2004

Post-Suharto era
Cabinets of Indonesia
2004 establishments in Indonesia
2009 disestablishments in Indonesia
Cabinets established in 2004
Cabinets disestablished in 2009